Sunderlandwick is a hamlet in the East Riding of Yorkshire, England.

It forms part of the civil parish of Hutton Cranswick.

Sunderlandwick House and its associated stables was designated a Grade II listed building on 15 July 1998.

Driffield Golf Club is actually in Sunderlandwick despite the name.

References

External links

Villages in the East Riding of Yorkshire